Jiří Novák and David Rikl were the last champions in 1998. None competed this year.

Byron Black and Donald Johnson won the title by defeating qualifiers Gastón Etlis and Martín Rodríguez 6–3, 7–5 in the final.

Seeds

Draw

Draw

References

External links
 Official results archive (ATP)
 Official results archive (ITF)

Mexican Open (tennis)
Doubles